Cibulka (feminine Cibulková) is a widespread name in the former Czechoslovakia as well as throughout the former Austro-Hungarian Empire, where it was frequently spelt Czibulka according to the older Hungarian orthography.  It may originate from a diminutive of the Czech word cibule, meaning "onion."

 Franz Cibulka (1946–2016), Austrian composer
 Hanns Cibulka (1920–2004), German poet
 Hans Cibulka, photographer
 Katharina Cibulka (born 1975), Austrian film maker and artist
 Petr Cibulka (born 1950), Czech politician
 Dominika Cibulková (born 1989), Slovak tennis player
 Vilma Cibulková (born 1963), Czech actress
 Alphons Czibulka (1842–1894), Hungarian-Viennese composer (after whom the Czibulkagasse is named)
 Alfons von Czibulka (1888–1969), Austro-Czech painter and writer (pseudonym: A. von Birnitz)

See also 

 Cybulski
 :de:Czibulka
 :sk:Cibulková

Czech-language surnames
Slovak-language surnames
Occupational surnames